Bullionism is an economic theory that defines wealth by the amount of precious metals owned. Bullionism is an early or primitive form of mercantilism. It was derived, during the 16th century, from the observation that the Kingdom of England, because of its large trade surplus, possessed large amounts of gold and silver—bullion—despite the fact that there was not any mining of precious metals in England.

Examples of bullionists
Thomas Milles (1550–1627) and others recommended that England increase exports to create a trade surplus, convert the surplus into precious metals, and hinder the drain of money and precious metal to other countries. England did restrict exportation of money or precious metals around 1600, but Milles wanted to resume using staple ports (ports where incoming foreign merchants were required to offer their goods for sale before anywhere else) to force merchants from abroad to use their assets to buy English goods and prevent them from transferring gold or silver from England homewards. Milles's opinions, however, were not widely valued. One of his contemporaries wrote, "Milles was so much out of step with the time that his pamphlets had little influence."

Gerard de Malynes (1586–1641), another bullionist, published a book named A Treatise of the Canker of England's Common Wealth, that asserted that the exchange of foreign currency had been a trade of value rather than exchanging the weight of metals. Therefore, the unfair exchanging of precious metals by bankers and money changers would cause a deficit in the English balance of trade. To ban the flow of exchange rates, he demanded the strict fixing of exchange rates for coins, only by the concentration of precious metals and weights, and for strict regulation and monitoring of foreign trade. He failed, however, to convince his contemporaries “...that the cambists were responsible for gold outflow or to elicit enthusiasm for a monopoly sale of exchange, par pro pari, by the royal exchanger." He did succeed in creating one of the first economic controversies, and Edward Misselden opposed him in 1623 in his book The Circle of Commerce: Or, the Balance of Trade.

See also
 Commodity money
 Gold standard
 Bimetallism
 Metallism
 Monetary policy
 Monetary economics
 Silverite

References

 Irvin L. Jeffery (2008). “Paradigm and Praxis: Seventeenth-Century Mercantilism and the Age of Liberalism” Ph.D. diss., University of Toledo.

International trade theory
Metallism
Preclassical economics